Thanu Krishna Murthy (born 13 August 1924), better known as T. K. Murthy, is an Indian mridangam player. Murthy is a Padma Shri and Sangeetha Kalanidhi awardee.

Personal life
Murthy was born on 13 August 1924, to Thanu Bhagavathar and Annapurni. Murthy started playing mridangam at the age of eight, without any formal training. When Thanjavur Vaidyanatha Iyer, a mridangam virtuoso and the founder of the Thanjavur style of mridangam, happened to listen to Murthy performing at a concert, he was impressed and decided to train Murthy. Vaidyanatha Iyer took Murthy to Tanjore, where Palghat Mani Iyer and Thambuswami (brother of eminent Carnatic vocalist T. M. Thiagarajan), were also undergoing training.

Murthy's family was full of court musicians and he is the fifth generation of musicians. The family has been in music continuously for 7 generations now. His son T.K. Jayaraman was a music composer at All India Radio and grandson Karthikeya Murthy is a film music composer.

Career 
Murthy made his debut at the age of eleven, at Coimbatore, in a concert of Musiri Subramania Iyer with Karur Chinnaswami Iyer on violin and Tanjore Vaidyanatha Iyer on mridangam. Murthy has performed in more than 15,000 concerts. In a career spanning over 80 years, Murthy has accompanied eminent artistes from several generations. Some of the notable artists with whom Murthy has performed include Harikesanallur Muthiah Bhagavatar, Ariyakudi Ramanuja Iyengar, Chembai Vaidhyanatha Bagavathar, Semmangudi Srinivasa Iyer, M. S. Subbulakshmi, Madurai Somasundaram, D. K. Jayaraman, M. Balamuralikrishna, Kunnakudi Vaidyanathan, Lalgudi Jayaraman, T. V. Sankaranarayanan and U. Srinivas. Although Murthy is a staunch follower of the Thanjavur style of mridangam, he was highly influenced by the artistry of the legendary Palani Subramaniam Pillai of the Pudukottai school of mridangam playing. This blend of the Thanjavur and Pudukottai schools has become the hallmark of Murthy's special style. His style also incorporates highly calculative patterns delivered with clarity and suddenness.

Recognition 

Murthy has received honors and awards including the following:
 Laya Ratnakara from Sivananda Saraswati, Rishikesh, 
 Kalaimamani from the T.N. Iyal Isai Nataka Mandram, 
 Mridanga Bhoopathy from Chembai Vaidyanatha Bhagavathar, 
 Mridanga Bhooshanam from Sri Sankaracharya of Kanchipuram, 
 Sangeet Natak Academy Award in 1987, 
 Palghat Mani Iyer Award by Percussive Arts Centre, Bangalore, 
 Tala Vilas Award by Sur Singar Samsad, Bombay, 
 Kerala Sangeetha Nataka Akademi Fellowship in 1989,
 Sangeetha Kalanidhi of The Music Academy.
 Sangeet Natak Academy Fellowship, 2010 (See 
 Padma Shri by the Government of India, 2017

He was the Asthana Vidwan in Trivandrum Palace. He is a graded "National Artiste" of Prasar Bharathi.

References

External links 

1924 births
Living people
Mridangam players
Tamil musicians
Recipients of the Sangeet Natak Akademi Award
Sangeetha Kalanidhi recipients
Recipients of the Padma Shri in arts
Recipients of the Sangeet Natak Akademi Fellowship